Charles Phillips (born 1938) was an American ice dancer.  Competing with Margie Ackles, he won the gold medal at the 1960 U.S. Figure Skating Championships.

Phillips lived in Hollywood and was a 1957 graduate of UCLA.  He and Ackles were coached by William Kipp.  In addition to competing with Ackles, Phillips won the U.S. Silver (Junior) dance title with Aileen Kahre in 1956.

Results

Ice Dance
(with Kahre)

(with Ackles)

Notes

Navigation

1938 births
Living people
American male ice dancers